Communities in the Province of Manitoba, Canada include incorporated municipalities, unincorporated communities and First Nations communities. 

Types of incorporated municipalities include urban municipalities, rural municipalities and local government districts. Urban municipalities can be named as cities, towns, villages or simply urban municipalities.

The administration of urban and rural municipalities is regulated by The Municipal Act.
Some municipalities have since amalgamated, making this list inaccurate. 

In the 2011 Census, Manitoba's communities combined for a total provincial population of 1,208,268.

Municipalities

Urban municipalities 
Manitoba has 79 urban municipalities, which includes the sub-types of cities, towns and villages.

Cities 

Manitoba has 10 cities.

Towns 

Manitoba has 25 towns.

Villages 

Manitoba has 2 villages.

Rural municipalities 

Manitoba has 116 rural municipalities.

Local government districts 
Manitoba has two local government districts.

Unincorporated communities 

Alonsa
Angusville
Anola
Argyle
Ashern
Ashville
Aubigny
Austin
Badger
Bakers Narrows
Balaton Beach
Baldur
Bender
Bender Hamlet
Berlo
Birch River
Birds Hill
Blumenort
Breezy Point
Brereton Lake
Brochet
Brunkild
Bruxelles
Caliento
Camper
Camperville
Chater
Chortitz
Clearwater
Cottonwoods
Cormorant
Cranberry Portage
Cromer
Cross Lake
Cypress River
Dennis Lake
Domain
Dominion City
Douglas
Duck Bay
Dugald
Easterville
East Selkirk
Elie
Elgin
Elm Creek
Elma
Elphinstone
Eriksdale
Erinview
Falcon Lake
Fisher Branch
Fisherton
Forrest
Fort Alexander
Foxwarren
Fraserwood
Fridensfeld
Friedensruh
Garden Hill
Gardenton
Garson
Gimli
Glass
Glenlea
Gods Lake Narrows
Gods River
Goose Creek
Gretna, Manitoba
Grosse Isle
Grunthal
Gull Harbour
Gunton
Gypsumville
Hadashville
Hecla
Hecla Village
Hnausa
Hochfeld
Hodgson
Holland
Husavik
Île-des-Chênes
Ilford
Inwood
Isabella
Island Lake
Jackhead
Kemnay
Kenville
Kenton
Killarney
Kleefeld
Komarno
La Broquerie
La Riviere
Lac Brochet
Landmark
Letellier
Libau
Lido Plage
Lilyfield
Little Grand Rapids
Lockport
Lorette
Lundar
Lundar Beach
MacGregor
Malonton
Marchand
Matlock
Meadow Lea
Meadows
Meleb
Miami
Miklavik
Moose Lake
Narcisse
Neelin
New Bothwell
Nelson House
Ninette
Norris Lake
Norway House
Oakbank
Oak Bluff
Oakburn
Oakville
Olha
Onanole
Oswald
Oxford House
Pierson
Pikwitonei
Piney
Pipestone
Prawda
Pukatawagan
Red Sucker Lake
Reinfeld
Rembrandt
Reston
Richer
Riding Mountain
River Hills
Roland 
Rosser
Sandy Hook
Siglavik
Southport
St. Adolphe
St. Boniface
St. Georges
St. François Xavier
St. James
St. Jean Baptiste
St. Laurent
St. Malo
St. Martin Junction
St. Theresa Point
Sandy Bay
Sandy Lake
Sanford
Seven Sisters
Shamattawa
Sherridon
Shilo
Shoal Lake
Silver
South Indian Lake
South Junction
Sperling
Split Lake
Sprague
Sprucewoods
Starbuck
Steep Rock
Steep Rock Junction
Stony Mountain
Stuartburn
Sundance
Sundown
Tadoule Lake
Teulon
Treesbank
Tolstoi
Tyndall
Vassar
Vista
Vita
Waasagomach
Wabowden
Wanless
Warren
West St. Paul
Whitemouth
Winnipeg
Winnipeg Beach
Woodlands
Woodroyd
Whytewold
York Factory
York Landing
Zbaraz
Zhoda

Hamlets 
Four unincorporated places in Manitoba are designated as hamlets.

Howden
Vogar
Waldersee
Wanless

Northern communities 
Manitoba recognizes 57 unincorporated places as northern communities.

Aghaming
Baden
Barrows
Berens River
Big Black River
Bissett
Brochet

Camperville
Cormorant
Crane River
Cross Lake
Dallas
Dauphin River
Dawson Bay
Duck Bay
Fisher Bay
Fisher River
Gods Lake Narrows
Granville Lake
Harwill
Herb Lake Landing
Homebrook
Ilford
Island Lake
Little Bullhead
Little Grand Rapids
Long Body Creek
Loon Straits
Mallard
Manigotagan
Matheson Island
Meadow Portage
Moose Lake
National Mills
Nelson House
Norway House
Oxford House
Pelican Rapids
Pikwitonei
Pine Dock
Poplarville
Powell
Princess Harbour
Red Deer Lake
Red Rose
Red Sucker Lake
Rock Ridge
Salt Point
Seymourville
Sherridon
South Indian Lake
Spence Lake
St. Theresa Point
Thicket Portage
Wabowden
Warren Landing
Waterhen
Westgate

Settlements 
Manitoba recognizes 12 unincorporated places as settlements.

Big Eddy
Grande Pointe
Manigotagan
Manitoba House
Norway House
Oak Island
Oak Point
Pasquia
Pine Creek
Rat River
St. Malo
Westbourne

See also 

 List of communities in Manitoba by population
 List of municipalities in Manitoba
 List of regions of Manitoba
 List of rural municipalities in Manitoba

Notes

References

External links 
 Government of Manitoba Community Profiles:
 Regional Map.
 Census Divisions Map.
 Municipality Profiles.

Communities